Spirit Rock or Spirit rock may refer to:

 Prahlad Friedman, American poker player from Los Angeles, California who has played as "Spirit Rock"
 Senior rock, a rock at or near a school campus that is painted by the students of the school.
 Spirit Rock Meditation Center, Woodacre, Marin County, California